Cannibal Sea is the third album by indie rock band The Essex Green.  It was released in March 2006 by Merge Records.

Background
Essex Green formed in 1997 in New York City. A part of The Elephant Six Collective, they released an EP and their debut album on Kindercore Records, followed by a second album, The Long Goodbye on Merge Records in 2003. Cannibal Sea was recorded in a number of studios, including producer Britt Meyers home studio, and released in April 2006.
The cover artwork was designed by Maggie Fost.

Critical response

Critical reaction to the album was mixed to positive. It currently holds a 78% rating, based on 16 critics' reviews, on the review aggregator site Metacritic, indicating "generally favorable" reviews.

Track listing
All tracks written by The Essex Green.

Personnel
The following people contributed to Cannibal Sea.
Chris Ziter – vocals, guitar
Sasha Bell – vocals, keyboards
Jeff Baron – guitar
Brent Arnold – performer
Kevin Barker – performer
Britt Meyers – producer, performer

References

The Essex Green albums
2006 albums
Merge Records albums